Willie "The Tiger" Gant (10 May 1899 – March 1974) was an American jazz bandleader and pianist.

History 
Gant began on piano at age 12, and at 13 he began studying under James P. Johnson. He played in local New York clubs and cafes from age 17. Gant recorded some sides in the 1920s, and after the dissolution of his Ramblers devoted himself almost exclusively to solo piano work. He played in New York at places like the Hotel Fairfax and Carutti's from the 1930s into the 1960s.

Musical groups 
Although he appears in a photograph with Lillyn Brown & Her Jazzbo Syncopators in 1921, he wasn't a band member and filled in for an absent piano player for the photo. He formed his own band, the Ramblers, that same year. Over the course of the next six years, Gant's band rivaled Fats Waller in popularity; it also served as early experience for many noted sideman, including Freddie Green, Ward Pinkett, Billy Taylor, Happy Caldwell, and Manzie Johnson.

Discography
Per the Jazz and Ragtime Records Index

With Eliza Christmas Lee
 I Ain't Givin' Nothin' Away (1921)
Arkansas Blues (1921)

With Josie Miles
 If You Want to Keep Your Daddy Home (1922) 
 You're Fooling with the Wrong Gal Now (1922) 
 When I Dream of Old Tennessee Blues (1922) 
 I Don't Want You (If You Don't Want Me) (1922) 
 Low Down 'Bama Blues (1923)

With Lavinia Turner
 How Many Times (1921)
 Can't Get Lovin' Blues (1921)
 A-Wearin' Away the Blues (1921)
 Sweet Man of Mine (1921)

References

External links
[ Willie Gant] at Allmusic

1899 births
1974 deaths
Musicians from New York (state)
American jazz bandleaders